Uta Ranke-Heinemann (2 October 1927 – 25 March 2021) was a German theologian, academic, and author. In 1969, she was the first woman in the world to be habilitated in Catholic theology. She held a chair of ancient Church history and the New Testament at the University of Duisburg-Essen. When her license to teach was revoked by the bishop because of her critical position in matters of faith, the university created a nondenominational chair of History of Religion. Her 1988 book Eunuchs for the Kingdom of Heaven, criticising the Catholic Church's stance on women and sexuality, was published in several editions, and translated in 12 languages. Her 1992 book Nein und Amen, revised in 2002, said there were "fairy tales you don't need to believe to have a living faith".

Life and career 
Uta Heinemann was born in Essen; her parents were Calvinist Protestants. Her father Gustav Heinemann was to become the third President of the Federal Republic of Germany from 1969 as a first member of the Social Democratic Party of Germany (SPD) in the position.

After nearly seven years' study of Protestant theology in Bonn, Basel, Oxford, and Montpellier, Heinemann converted to Catholicism in 1953, when she married a Catholic religion teacher, Edmund Ranke. The couple had two sons. She was promoted to doctor in 1954 in Munich, making her the first woman to be so (together with ). One of her fellow students and a friend at that time was Joseph Ratzinger, later known as Pope Benedict XVI.

In 1969, Ranke-Heinemann became the first woman in the world to be habilitated in Catholic theology, at the University of Munich. She subsequently held the Essen University chair of ancient Church history and the New Testament from 1970.

Ranke-Heinemann was active in the peace movement. During the Vietnam War, she supported the ban on napalm bombs. She travelled to the Communist North Vietnam. In 1979, she organized food for Cambodia suffering a famine. She taught from 1980 in Duisburg, and from 1985 in Essen. In 1987 Bishop of Essen Franz Hengsbach withdrew her license to teach Catholic theology for disputing the virgin birth of Jesus. This effectively disqualified her from the post she had held for three years. The University of Essen created a new chair for her, for History of Religion. Her principal book dealing critically with sexuality in the Catholic Church, in English Eunuchs for the Kingdom of Heaven: Women, sexuality, and the Catholic Church, appeared first in 1988, and in many subsequent editions. It was translated to 12 languages.

In 1999, Ranke-Heinemann was a candidate for President of Germany, without party membership, but lost to Johannes Rau, the husband of her niece Christina.

She announced her break with conventional Christianity altogether in 1992. Ranke-Heinemann died at her home in Essen on 25 March 2021 at age 93.

Beliefs 

Ranke-Heinemann's book Nein und Amen, announcing her break with the church, was first published in 1992 and reprinted several times; the book was translated into English as Putting Away Childish Things. Spanish and Polish translations followed. She revised it in 2002, after the death of her husband, with the new subtitle Mein Abschied vom traditionellen Christentum, declaring a sevenfold "farewell to traditional Christianity":

 The Bible is not the word of God but the word of men.
 That God exists in three persons is the imagination of men.
 Jesus is man and not God.
 Mary is the mother of Jesus and not the mother of God.
 God created heaven and earth, but hell is a product of human fantasy.
 The devil and original sin do not exist.
 A bloody redemption at the Cross is a pagan sacrificial slaughtering of a human being, based on a model from the religious Stone Age.

She wrote:

Works 

Translated into English as:
 
Extended 2012 edition:
 
 
 1992 edition translated as:

References 

1927 births
2021 deaths
Writers from Essen
Alumni of the University of Oxford
University of Bonn alumni
University of Montpellier alumni
20th-century German Catholic theologians
Women Christian theologians
Converts to Roman Catholicism from Lutheranism
Candidates for President of Germany
Ludwig Maximilian University of Munich alumni
University of Basel alumni
Nontrinitarian Christians
Academic staff of the University of Duisburg-Essen
Children of national leaders
Gustav Heinemann
Denial of the virgin birth of Jesus
Dissident Roman Catholic theologians